S.S.C. Napoli continued its steady decline with another lacklustre season. Once more, goalscoring was at a premium, with only 28 goals being scored in the 34 league games. Coach Luigi Simoni was sacked and replaced by youth team coach Vincenzo Montefusco, who led the team to the Coppa Italia final against Vicenza, where Napoli won at home thanks to Fabio Pecchia's goal, but lost 3-0 away from home, and therefore failed to win the trophy. The 13th place in the domestic league was the worst for 14 years, and one year on, Napoli was ultimately relegated.

Squad

Transfers

Winter

Competitions

Serie A

League table

Results by round

Matches

Coppa Italia

Eightfinals

Quarter-finals

Semifinals

Final

Statistics

Players statistics

References

Sources
RSSSF - Italy 1996/97

S.S.C. Napoli seasons
Napoli